S. Raamanathan (1929 – 9 January 2013) was an Indian film director and producer. He began as an Assistant Director in Indian cinema from 1951 until 1958, then he worked as a Director in Indian cinema. In the 1970s he worked in the Hindi industry with Amitabh Bachchan on several occasions such as in Bombay to Goa (1972) and Mahaan (1983). Zamaanat, a project with Bachchan which had been delayed since 1996, was still awaiting release in 2014. He produced several Kannada films along with his brother Shivaram and formed the home banner "Rashi Brothers". He died on 9 January 2013 in Chennai.

Filmography
India
Naadodikal (1959)
Shreekovil (1962)
Shree Guruvayoorappan (1964)
Devaalayam (1964)
Pattathu Rani (1967)
Ipadunay Aiye? (1967)
Ponnu Mappillai (1969)
Iru Thuruvam (1971)
Bombay to Goa (1972)
Ranganna Sabatham (1972)
Do Phool (1973)
Sabse Bada Rupaiya (1976)
Rangila Ratan (1976)
Devata (1978)
Shikshaa (1979)
Love in Canada (1979)
Kahani Ek Chor Ki (1981)
Dial 100 (1982)
Mahaan (1983)
Faisla (1988)

References

External links

1929 births
2013 deaths
Hindi-language film directors
Film producers from Chennai
Film directors from Chennai
20th-century Indian film directors
Hindi film producers